"Why Ain't I Running" is a song co-written and recorded by American country music artist Garth Brooks.  It was released in March 2003 as the fifth single from the album Scarecrow.  The song reached #24 on the Billboard Hot Country Singles & Tracks chart.  The song was written by Brooks, Tony Arata and Kent Blazy.

Chart performance

References

2003 singles
2003 songs
Garth Brooks songs
Songs written by Tony Arata
Songs written by Kent Blazy
Songs written by Garth Brooks
Song recordings produced by Allen Reynolds
Capitol Records Nashville singles